The 2009–10 FA Cup (known as The FA Cup sponsored by E.ON for sponsorship reasons) was the 129th season of the world's oldest football knockout competition; the FA Cup. As in the previous year, 762 clubs were accepted for the competition. One club, Newcastle Blue Star, folded before the fixtures were released. As they were scheduled to enter the competition in the First Round Qualifying, their opponents in this round received a walkover.

The competition commenced on 15 August 2009 with the Extra Preliminary Round and concluded on 15 May 2010 with the Final, held at Wembley Stadium. The final was contested by 2009 winners Chelsea and 2008 winners Portsmouth. Originally, the winners were to qualify for the play-off round of the 2010–11 UEFA Europa League. However, as Chelsea won the 2009–10 Premier League (and did not need the FA Cup winners' berth), and Portsmouth failed to apply for a UEFA licence for the 2010–11 season in time (making them ineligible to compete in UEFA competitions), the berth was given to Liverpool, the seventh-placed team in the Premier League. Chelsea won 1–0 in the final to retain the trophy.

Teams

Calendar
The calendar for the 2009–10 FA Cup, as announced by The Football Association:

Qualifying rounds

All of the teams that entered the competition, but were not members of the Premier League or The Football League, had to compete in the qualifying rounds.

First round proper
Teams from Leagues One and Two entered at this stage, along with the winners from the Fourth Round Qualifying. The draw was made on 25 October 2009 with ties played in the week beginning 6 November 2009.

Lowestoft Town and Paulton Rovers of the eighth tier were the lowest ranked teams left in the competition at this stage, but both failed to make it through to the Second Round.

Second round proper
The matches took place on 28 and 29 November 2009 and involved the 40 winning teams from the previous round.

Bath City and Staines Town from the Conference South, and Northwich Victoria from the Conference North (6th tier) were the lowest ranked teams left at this stage, but none made it through to the Third Round.

† – After extra time

Third round proper
The draw was held on Sunday 29 November 2009 at Wembley Stadium. Premier League and Football League Championship teams entered at this stage, joining the winners from the previous round and completing the entrants. The majority of fixtures took place on 2 and 3 January 2010, with snow postponing several matches until mid-January.

Barrow, Forest Green Rovers, Luton Town and York City from the Conference National (5th tier) were the only non-league teams left at this stage, but none made it through to the Fourth Round.

Manchester United were knocked out in the Third Round for the first time since they lost to Bournemouth in 1984, when they lost to third-tier rivals Leeds United. It was also Manchester United's first defeat to a lower league side since defeat at Bournemouth. They were joined by rivals and fellow 'Big Four' club Liverpool, who lost at home to second-flight Reading in a replay.

† – After extra time

Fourth round proper
The draw was held on Sunday 3 January 2010 at Wembley Stadium. Fixtures took place over the weekend of 23 and 24 January 2010.

Accrington Stanley and Notts County from League Two (4th tier) were the lowest ranked teams left at this stage; Accrington Stanley did not proceed further, whilst Notts County defeated Wigan Athletic in a replay at the DW Stadium.

Fifth round proper
The draw was conducted by Geoff Thomas and Stephanie Moore MBE on Sunday 24 January 2010 at Wembley Stadium. Fixtures took place over the weekend of 13 and 14 February 2010. Notts County from the Football League Two (4th tier) were the lowest-ranked team left at this stage, but they went out 4–0 to Premier League side Fulham.

† – After extra time

Sixth round proper
The draw was conducted by former England striker Luther Blissett and TV presenter Tim Lovejoy on 14 February 2010 at Football Association headquarters at Wembley Stadium. Fixtures took place over the weekend of 6 and 7 March 2010. Reading from the Championship (2nd tier) were the lowest ranked team left at this stage.

Semi-finals
The draw was conducted by David Ginola and Jason Cundy at Wembley Stadium on Sunday, 7 March 2010. Both matches took place at Wembley Stadium over the weekend of 10 and 11 April.

Final

The final was played on 15 May 2010 at Wembley Stadium, London

Top scorers

Media coverage
In the United Kingdom, ITV were the sole network broadcasters for the season as subscription broadcasters Setanta Sports entered administration and ceased operations before the start of the season. The Football Association streamed select games live on its website for free.

International broadcasters

References

External links
The FA Cup at thefa.com

 
2009-10
2009–10 in English football